Mark Li is a Taiwanese politician. A member of the Kuomintang, he served in the Legislative Yuan from 2008 to 2012.

Li earned degrees from National Cheng Kung University and Claremont Graduate University. While studying in the United States, he obtained American citizenship.

Li was elected to the Legislative Yuan in 2008 via party list proportional representation.

References

Living people
Party List Members of the Legislative Yuan
Members of the 7th Legislative Yuan
National Cheng Kung University alumni
Claremont Graduate University alumni
Former United States citizens
Taiwanese emigrants to the United States
Year of birth missing (living people)